John Gerard de Forest (31 March 1907 – 10 April 1997) was an English amateur golfer. He won the Amateur Championship in 1932 and was in the Walker Cup team the same year.

Golf career
de Forest reached the final of the Amateur Championship in 1931, losing to Eric Martin Smith by 1 hole. The following year he reached the final again, this time beating Eric Fiddian 3&1. Both de Forest and Fiddian were selected for the 1932 Walker Cup team following their semi-final wins. The Walker Cup was held at The Country Club in Brookline, Massachusetts on 1 and 2 September. De Forest lost his foursomes match and was not selected for the singles.

Personal life
De Forest was the younger son of Maurice de Forest. In the 1930s, Maurice de Forest was granted the title Count Maurice de Bendern, and in early 1937 John de Forest adopted the name John de Bendern. His first wife was Lady Patricia Sybil Douglas, daughter of Francis Douglas, 11th Marquess of Queensberry. Their children were:
 Caroline de Bendern (b. 1940), who married saxophonist Barney Wilen. She was a political activist, who became symbol of May 1968 protests when she was photographed in Paris.
 Simon Frederick de Bendern (b. 1946), who married Ethel von Horn in 1974.
 Emma Magdalen de Bendern (1950-2021), who married firstly journalist Nigel Dempster, secondly Giles Trentham, and thirdly Prince George Galitzine.
He had two other children after his divorce from Patricia Douglas.
 Michael Fulke de Bendern (b.1954)
 Samantha Grace de Bendern (b.1965), international civil servant, political journalist and writer.

De Forest had an elder brother, Alaric (1905–1973), who also adopted the Bendern name. Alaric was also a useful golfer, and reached the semi-final of the Amateur Championship in 1937, losing 4&3 to Lionel Munn. John and Alaric met in the final of the 1937 Dutch Open Amateur Championship, with Alaric winning by one hole.

Amateur wins
1931 Surrey Amateur Championship
1932 Amateur Championship
1937 Austrian Open Amateur Championship
1949 Surrey Amateur Championship

Major championships

Wins (1)

Results timeline

Note: de Forest only played in the Open Championship and the Masters.

WD = withdrew
CUT = missed the half-way cut

Team appearances
Walker Cup (representing Great Britain): 1932
England–Scotland Amateur Match (representing England): 1931
England–Ireland Amateur Match (representing England): 1931 (winners)

References

English male golfers
Amateur golfers
Golfers from London
1907 births
1997 deaths